Treasure Hunt is a 1994 Hong Kong action comedy and romantic fantasy film written and directed by Jeffrey Lau and starring Chow Yun-fat and Jacklyn Wu.

Plot
Chinese American CIA operative Jeffrey Cheung Ching (Chow Yun-fat) was ordered to escort a Chinese national treasure to the United States. Cheung goes from America to Beijing where he stays at the Shaolin temple. There, he encounters conflicts due to culture barriers and different life habits. However, he became friends with Abbot Hung Chi (Gordon Liu) and a seven-year-old monk Grasshopper (Choi Yue). Cheung is later surprised to find out that the so-called national treasure is a para psychological girl named Siu-ching (Jacklyn Wu). During the process of exposing the evil sinister, Cheung and Ching develop a romance.

Cast
Chow Yun-fat as Jeffrey Cheung Ching
Jacklyn Wu as Mui Siu-ching
Chin Han as Tong Ling / Captain Chiu
Gordon Liu as Abbot Hung Chi
Michael Wong as Michael
Philip Kwok as Kung Ching
Roy Chiao as Uncle Bill
Choi Yue as Priestling Grasshopper
Giorgio Pasotti as Ng Yan
Wong Kwan-hong as Wai-tak
Jun Kunimura as Yamamoto
George Saunders as Joe
Alex Sheafe as Mr. Ford
Jeffrey Lau as Nakajima
Anita Wong as Bill's wife
Gary Young Lim aka Gary Lam Jan Hong as Jeffrey's cousin
Sylvia Chen as Jeffrey's cousin
Elizabeth Lai as Chinese teacher
Cherl Maxfield as American friend
Tamara Session as American friend
Rose Tenison as American friend
Fu Xin-min
Wang Shao-qi
Wang Qi-qhang
Ju Xin-hua as Spy #A
Yu Yan-kai as Spy #B
Zhu Yu-kui as Spy #C

Box office
The film grossed HK$37,033,685 at the Hong Kong box office during its theatrical run from 29 January to 16 March 1994 in Hong Kong.

Award nominations
14th Hong Kong Film Awards
Nominated: Best Actor (Chow Yun-fat)
Nominated: Best Cinematography (Peter Pau)

See also
Chow Yun-fat filmography

External links

Treasure Hunt at Hong Kong Cinemagic

Treasure Hunt film review at LoveHKFilm.com

1994 films
1994 action comedy films
1994 romantic comedy films
1994 fantasy films
Hong Kong action comedy films
Hong Kong romantic comedy films
1990s romantic fantasy films
1990s adventure comedy films
Gun fu films
1990s spy films
Hong Kong martial arts films
1994 martial arts films
Kung fu films
1990s Cantonese-language films
Shaolin Temple in film
Films directed by Jeffrey Lau
Films set in Beijing
Films set in the United States
Films about the Central Intelligence Agency
1990s Hong Kong films